Lipót Baumhorn (28 December 1860, Kisbér – 8 July 1932, Kisbér) was a Hungarian architect of Jewish heritage, the most influential Hungarian synagogue architect in the first half of the 20th century. He drew blueprints for about 20 synagogues in the Kingdom of Hungary.

Career 
He graduated from the main real school in Győr, the technical university in Vienna under Freiherr von Ferstel, König and Weyr. Then he came to Budapest and worked for 12 years in the office of architects Ödön Lechner and Gyula Pártos. In 1893 and 1899. He traveled to Italy, 1904. to Central Europe for architectural studies. His first independent work was the Moorish-style synagogue in Esztergom, built in 1888, which established his reputation. Since then, B. built 22 synagogues in Hungary, the most significant of which is Szeged (1903), which was one of the largest in the old Austro-Hungarian monarchy (with 740 men's and 600 women's seats), significant new rural, Nagybecskerek, Fiume, Brassó, Temesvár, Szolnok, Cegléd, Eger, Losonc, Liptószentmiklós, Budapest: Aréna-út, Páva utca, Csáky utca synagogues. Other buildings include: The King of Győr. table (1890), the glass factories of Salgótarján (1893), the pavilion of the paper and reproduction industry of the millennial exhibition (1896), the headquarters of the Temesvár Valley Water Regulatory Company, the Temesvár higher girls' school, the headquarters of the Szeged-Csongrád Savings Bank, (1903), the Újvidék Savings Bank the Baja Savings Bank, the Temesvár Lloyd and the Stock Exchange Palace (1910–12).

Buildings

Secular buildings 
    Temesvár-Béga Palace (Timișoara)
    Junior High School (Timișoara, 1902–1904) (with Jakab Klein) 
    Szeged-Csongrád Savings Bank (Szeged, Széchenyi tér 7. – Takarékpénztár u. 7. 1902–1903) 
    Iron house (Szeged, Horváth Mihály u. 9. – Takarékpénztár u. 8., 1912–1913) 
    Wagner Palace (Szeged, Kölcsey u. 4. – Kárász u. 14., 1904–1905) 
    Savings Bank Palace (Újvidék (Novi Sad), 1904)
    Menrat’s Palace (Újvidék (Novi Sad), 1908)
    Tomin's Palace (Újvidék (Novi Sad), 1909)
    Csata Street School (Budapest, 13th district, Csata u. 20., 1909–1911) 
    Wagner Palace (Szeged, Feketesas u. 28., 1910–1911) 
    Forbát House (Szeged, Dugonics tér 11. – Lajos Tisza 60., 1911–1912) 
    Lloyd's Palace (Timișoara, 1912) 
    Metal Trading Company Limited Office Building (Budapest, 13th district, Balzac u. 5., 1922)

Headquarters of the Jewish Community 
 Headquarters of the Jewish Community of Szeged (Gutenberg u. 20 - Jósika 12., 1901–1903, Szeged)

Synagogues 

Lipót Baumhorn designed many synagogues. The following is a detailed list:

Expansions 

    Draft of the Lipótváros Synagogue (1899)
    Expansion of the Pécs Synagogue (1905)
    Reconstruction of the Kaposvár Synagogue (1905–1906)
    Reconstruction of the Synagogue of Liptovský Mikuláš (1906)
    Reconstruction and minor transformation of the Szeged Old Synagogue (1906) 
    Expansion of the Újpest Synagogue (1909)
    Redesigning the damaged dome of Kecskemét synagogue with his finger (1910)
    Transformation of Kass Vígadó into a hotel (Szeged, Dózsa u. 1. – Stefánia 8. – Arany János u. 2–4. 1916) 
    Extension of the Csáky Street Synagogue (1925–1927)
    Reconstruction of the Nagykanizsa Synagogue (1928)
    Plans for the New Synagogue of Žilina (1920s). He did not win the tender.
    Expansion of the Bethlen Space Synagogue (1931–1932)

References

External links 

 Magyar Életrajzi Lexikon 1000-1990 at www.mek.iif.hu

1860 births
1932 deaths
People from Kisbér
Hungarian Jews
Hungarian architects
Jewish architects
Synagogue architecture